Baroody is a surname of Lebanese origin. Notable people with the name include:

 Benjamin Baroody, American politician, New Hampshire House of Representatives from 1992 to 2012
 Jamil Baroody (1905–1979), Saudi diplomat
 Michael Baroody (born 1946), American lobbyist
 Phoebe Baroody Stanton (1915–2003), née Phoebe Baroody; Lebanese–American architectural historian, professor at Johns Hopkins University from 1955 to 1982
 William Baroody (disambiguation)
 William J. Baroody Sr. (1916–1980), American politician and president of the American Enterprise Institute, 1962–1978
 William J. Baroody Jr. (1937–1996), American politician and president of the American Enterprise Institute, 1978–1986

Surnames of Lebanese origin